Lion of Judas is the second album by deathcore band Elysia. The album has a large change in style compared to the band's previous album, drawing heavy influence from Converge, Botch, and Cave In. It was released on June 10, 2008 on Ferret Records. The album was leaked to P2P file sharing networks in early May 2008.

Track listing
All tracks by Elysia & Zak Vargas

"Lack of Culture" - 2:47
"Flood of Kings" - 2:01
"Box of Need(les)" - 3:38
"Crown of Thorns" - 4:11
"Plague of Insects" - 3:26
"Pride of Lions" - 2:03
"Curse of God (part 1)" - 2:21
"Fountain of Life (part 2)" - 2:42
"Lion of Judas" - 4:57

Personnel 

John Malanowski - bass, vocals
Steven Sessler - drums
Chris Cain - guitar
Garrett Gilardi - guitar
Zak Vargas - vocals

References

Elysia (band) albums
2008 albums
Albums produced by Kurt Ballou
Ferret Music albums
Albums with cover art by Sons of Nero